Kenneth Charles Donald Fyffe (14 March 1938 – 19 June 2022) was an Australian rules footballer who played with North Melbourne in the Victorian Football League (VFL).

Notes

External links 

1938 births
2022 deaths
Australian rules footballers from Victoria (Australia)
North Melbourne Football Club players
Redan Football Club players
Ballarat Football Club players